The 1976 Goodrich Radial Challenge was an Australian motor racing series open to Group C Touring Cars of up to 3000cc capacity. It was contested over four rounds, each being staged with a round of the 1976 Rothmans International Series. Cars were required to use street radial tyres provided by the series sponsor, BF Goodrich Australia.

The series was won by Bill Evans driving a Datsun 1200 Coupe.

Series schedule
The 1976 Goodrich Radial Challenge was contested over four rounds.

The meeting at Surfers Paradise International Raceway was postponed for one week due to heavy rain and the rescheduled meeting was cancelled after Saturday practice due to further rain.

Class structure
Car competed in three classes:
 Class A: Up to 1300cc
 Class B: 1301 to 2000cc
 Class C: 2001 to 3000cc

Points system
Points were awarded on a 10-9-8-7-6-5-4-3-2-1 basis for the first ten positions in each class at each round.

Series results

References

Goodrich Radial Challenge